Therinus ( or ), also known as Therinus of Butrint, was a Christian saint revered in Albania. Therinus was massacred in the 3rd century, during a wave of anti-Christian persecution, probably at the time of the Roman Emperor Decius (r. 249–251) His feast day is celebrated on April 23.

See also

 Buthrotum
 Donatus of Butrint

References

3rd-century Christian saints
Saints of Roman Macedonia
People from Buthrotum
Year of death unknown
Year of birth unknown
Albanian saints
Eastern Orthodox Christians from Albania